Frank Herbert Johnson (born July 22, 1942, at El Paso, Texas) is a retired American professional baseball player. Primarily an outfielder and third baseman, he had a 13-season career that included one full season and parts of five others (1966–1967; 1969–1971) with the San Francisco Giants of Major League Baseball.

He got into 67 games played with the  Giants, but batted only .190 in 174 at bats during "The Year of the Pitcher." His best pro season came in  when he batted .353 in the Pacific Coast League, then spent another 67 games with the MLB Giants, where he registered a career-high .273 batting average, 44 hits, three home runs and 31 runs batted in as a backup left fielder and first baseman. His MLB career coincided with the final years of the Willie Mays era, when the Giants also featured such young outfielders as Jesús Alou, Bobby Bonds, Ollie Brown, George Foster, Jim Ray Hart and Ken Henderson.

All told, Johnson collected 92 Major League hits in 192 games and 436 at bats. His playing career ended after the 1975 campaign.

External links

1942 births
Living people
African-American baseball players
Baseball players from Texas
Decatur Commodores players
Hawaii Islanders players
Lotte Orions players
Major League Baseball outfielders
Nippon Professional Baseball outfielders
Sportspeople from El Paso, Texas
Phoenix Giants players
Salem Rebels players
San Francisco Giants players
Springfield Giants players
Tacoma Giants players
21st-century African-American people
20th-century African-American sportspeople